Alejandro "Álex" Ramos Rodríguez (born 11 April 2000) is a Spanish footballer who plays as an attacking midfielder for Polvorín FC.

Club career
Born in Arteixo, A Coruña, Galicia, Ramos began his career with hometown side Atlético Arteixo, and subsequently represented Montañeros CF and RC Celta de Vigo before joining RCD Espanyol's youth setup in 2014. He left in 2017 to Real Valladolid, and played for Racing de Ferrol before finishing his formation with CD Lugo.

In 2019, Ramos signed for Tercera División side CSD Arzúa, and was a regular starter during the most of the campaign.

Ramos made his first team debut on 12 November 2022, starting in a 1–0 away loss against Arenas Club de Getxo, for the season's Copa del Rey. He made his professional debut eight days later, replacing El Hacen in a 4–0 Segunda División loss at FC Andorra.

References

External links

2000 births
Living people
Spanish footballers
People from A Coruña (comarca)
Sportspeople from the Province of A Coruña
Footballers from Galicia (Spain)
Association football midfielders
Segunda División players
Segunda Federación players
Tercera División players
Tercera Federación players
Polvorín FC players
CD Lugo players